Alfredo Anhielo (born 30 August 1951) is a former Argentine soccer player who played in the NASL.

Career statistics

Club

Notes

References

1951 births
Living people
Argentine footballers
Argentine expatriate footballers
Association football goalkeepers
Defensores de Belgrano footballers
Club Atlético Colegiales (Argentina) players
San Lorenzo de Almagro footballers
Club Atlético Banfield footballers
Tampico Madero F.C. footballers
Club Real Potosí players
Los Angeles Aztecs players
Phoenix Inferno players
Quilmes Atlético Club footballers
North American Soccer League (1968–1984) players
Major Indoor Soccer League (1978–1992) players
Expatriate footballers in Mexico
Argentine expatriate sportspeople in Mexico
Expatriate footballers in Bolivia
Argentine expatriate sportspeople in Bolivia
Expatriate soccer players in the United States
Argentine expatriate sportspeople in the United States